Toy is a one-man project band of Korean pop singer-songwriter and pianist You Hee-yeol.

Career
Toy started as a duo of You Hee-yeol and Yoon Jeong-oh, and was named after their two initials 'Y', as in Two + Y = Toy.

However, after releasing Toy's debut album, Yoon Jeong-oh left the band to study overseas and You Hee-yeol joined the navy for his mandatory military service. You Hee-yeol has been the sole member of Toy since 1996.

After his discharge from military service, You released Toy's second studio album Yooheeyeol. The title song "Remember I Was Next to You", sung by Kim Yeon-woo, became a big hit and the album was a commercial success.

In 1997, Toy released the third studio album Present and also started a record label named Toy Music (currently Antenna). After a six-year hiatus from Fermata (2001), the band released their sixth studio album Thank You, with the title song "A Passionate Goodbye" featuring vocals by E Z Hyoung.

Discography

Studio albums
 Da Capo (2014)
 Thank You (2007)
 Fermata (2001)
 A Night in Seoul (1999)
 Present (1997)
 Youheeyeol (1996)
 Inside My Heart (1994)

Live albums
 Toy Live (2001)

Compilation albums
 The History of Toy (2001)

Awards

Korean Music Awards

Mnet Asian Music Awards

References

External links
 Toy's official website

K-pop music groups
Electronica music groups
South Korean pop music groups
Korean Music Award winners
Melon Music Award winners